55 may refer to: 
55 (number)
55 BC
AD 55
1955
2055

Science
Caesium, by the element's atomic number

Astronomy
Messier object M55, a magnitude 7.0 globular cluster in the constellation Sagittarius
The New General Catalogue object NGC 55, a magnitude 7.9 barred spiral galaxy in the constellation Sculptor

Transportation
The highest speed limit allowed in the United States between 1974 and 1986 per the National Maximum Speed Law
Highway 55, several roads
Route 55 (disambiguation), bus and tram routes

Film
55 Days at Peking a film starring Charlton Heston and David Niven

Other uses
Gazeta 55, an Albanian newspaper 
Agitation and Propaganda against the State, also known as Constitution law 55, a law during Communist Albania.
+55, the code for international direct dial phone calls to Brazil
5:5, law enforcement code for handcuffs
55 (album), by the Knocks
"55 (Hamsa oua Hamsine)", an instrumental by the Master Musicians of Joujouka from Brian Jones Presents the Pipes of Pan at Joujouka
"Fifty Five", a song by Karma to Burn from the album Arch Stanton, 2014

See also
55th Regiment of Foot (disambiguation)
Channel 55 (disambiguation)
Type 55 (disambiguation)
Class 55 (disambiguation)